Hello is a Ugandan drama short film directed by John Martyn Ntabazi and written by Usama Mukwaya. The movie was made under the MNFPAC workshop and won the overall best short film. It debuted its screening at the 2011 Pearl International Film Festival. It is Usama's first screenplay.

Plot 
The invasive development of phone technology is throwing one husband and wife off balance. When Kakumba finds his wife engrossed in a 'romantic' conversation on the phone with some unknown correspondent, he immediately suspects that his wife is cheating on him.

Cast 

 Laura Kahunde as Rehema
 John Martyn Ntabazi
 Katushabe Siam

References

External links
 
 

2011 short films
Ugandan short films
Films shot in Uganda
2011 films
Films with screenplays by Usama Mukwaya
Ugandan drama films